= Shuqualak Creek =

Stream in Mississippi, U.S.

Coordinates: 32.9698505°N 88.4425381°W

Shuqualak Creek is a stream in the U.S. state of Mississippi.

Shuqualak is a name derived from the Choctaw language purported to mean "beads". A variant name is "Shocoloc Creek".
